The Vairocanābhisaṃbodhi Sūtra (Vairocana’s Awakening Sutra), also known as the Mahāvairocana Tantra (also known as 大日經 Da Ri Jing) is an important Vajrayana Buddhist text composed before 674 CE. The Indian tantric master Buddhaguhya (fl. c.700 CE) classified the text as a caryātantra, and in Tibetan Buddhism it is still considered to be a member of the carya classification. In Japan where it is known as the Mahāvairocana Sūtra (Daibirushana jōbutsu jinpen kajikyō), it is one of two central texts in the Shingon school, along with the Vajrasekhara Sutra. Both are also part of the Tendai school.

The longer title of the scripture is Mahāvairocanābhisaṃbodhivikurvitādhiṣṭhānavaipulyasūtrendrarājanāmadharmaparyāya (Dharma Discourse Called “Mahāvairocana’s Awakening and His Empowerment of Miracles,” King of the Best of the Extensive Scriptures). Though the text is often called a tantra by later figures (including later Indian commentators), the scripture does not call itself a tantra.

Composition & history

The Mahāvairocana Tantra is the first true Buddhist tantra, the earliest comprehensive manual of tantric Buddhism. It was probably composed in the middle of the 7th century, in all probability in north-eastern India at Nālandā. Evidence to support the text's composition in Nalanda include the fact that many of the Buddhist scholars involved in the transmission of the text resided in Nalanda including Buddhaguhya and Śubhakarasiṃha. The description of plants and trees in the MVT also matches those found in the region surrounding Nalanda in North-East India.

According to Rofl Giebel, "the Chinese translation was produced in seven fascicles by Śubhākarasiṃha (637–735) and his Chinese disciple Yixing (683–727) in 724–5, apparently on the basis of a manuscript sent to China some decades earlier by the Chinese monk Wuxing, who died in India in 674."

The Mahāvairocana Tantra was later translated into Tibetan sometime before 812 by Śīlendrabodhi and Kawa Paltsek.

The Sanskrit text of the Mahāvairocana Tantra is lost, but it survives in Chinese and Tibetan translations. The Chinese translation has preserved the original Sanskrit mantras in the Siddhaṃ script. There are translations from both into English. (see below).

A major commentary by Buddhaguhya was written in about 760 and is preserved in Tibetan. Hodge translates it into English alongside the text itself. Four originally Sanskrit commentaries on the Vairocanābhisaṃbodhi have survived, two by Śubhākarasiṃha (extant in Chinese) and two by Buddhaguhya (extant in Tibetan).

Kūkai learned of the Mahāvairocana Tantra in 796, and travelled to China in 804 to receive instruction in it.

Contents

The Mahāvairocana Tantra consists of three primary mandalas corresponding to the body, speech and mind of Mahāvairocana, as well as preliminary practices and initiation rituals. According to Buddhaguhya’s  (a summary of the main points of the tantra) the Mahāvairocana Tantra system of practice is in three stages: preliminary, application, and accomplishment. Attached here and there are doctrinal passages, and sadhana practices which relate back to the main mandalas.

The following outline is based on Hodge's translation of the Tibetan version of the Sutra. The Chinese version has differences in the order of the chapters.

Chapters
 I - The sutra begins in a timeless setting of Mahavairocana Buddha's palace (symbolizing all of existence), with a dialogue between Mahavairocana Buddha and his disciple Vajrasattva. In chapter one, Mahavairocana Buddha expounds the Dharma to a great host of bodhisattvas, with emphasis on the relationship between form and emptiness.
 II-VI Three chapters on the mandala of the Body Mystery with detailed instruction on the laying out of the mandala and the  ritual. This mandala is also known as the Mandala of the Womb Realm (Sanskrit : Garbhakosha).
 VII-IX Three miscellaneous chapters originally at the end of the text. They are at the end in the Chinese version.
 X-XII Three chapters on the mandala of the Speech Mystery. Includes a series of glosses on meditating using the letters of the alphabet in various combinations.
 XII-XVI Five chapters on the mandala of the Mind Mystery.
 XVII A stand alone chapter that may once have circulated separately. 
 XVIII-XIX A further chapter regarding meditating on the letters of the alphabet which involves placing them around the body while visualising oneself as the Buddha.
 XX A standalone chapter address to bodhisattvas.
 XXI-XXV Four chapters on the 100 syllable meditation.
 XXVI-XXX Five miscellaneous chapters including the six homa rites.

Esoteric precepts 

Chapter 2 of the sutra also contains four precepts, called the samaya, that form the basic precepts esoteric Buddhist practitioners must follow:

 Not to abandon the true Dharma;
 Not to deviate from one's own enlightened mind;
 Not to be reserved in sharing with others the Buddhist teachings;
 Not to bring harm to any sentient beings.

Shingon lineage 

The Mahavairocana Tantra does not trace its lineage to Shakyamuni Buddha, the founder of Buddhism.  Instead it comes directly from Mahavairocana. The lineage then being, according to the Shingon tradition:

 Vajrasattva, the disciple of Mahavairocana Buddha in this sutra;
 Nagarjuna received the text of the Mahāvairocana Tantra directly from Vajrasattva inside an iron stupa in South India;
 Nagabodhi, Nagarjuna's disciple;
 Vajrabodhi, an Indian monk famous for translating esoteric rituals into Chinese language;
 Amoghavajra, Vajrabodhi's famous disciple, and expert in esoteric practices;
 Huiguo, a Chinese esoteric master;
 Kūkai, founder of Shingon Buddhism in Japan.

Understanding of enlightenment 

Within the vision of the Mahavairocana Sutra, the state of bodhi ("awakening, enlightenment") is seen as naturally inherent to the mind - the mind's natural and pure state (as in Dzogchen and Tathagatagarbha) - and is viewed as the perceptual sphere of non-duality, where all false distinctions between a perceiving subject and perceived objects are lifted and the true state of things (non-duality) is revealed. This is also the understanding of Enlightenment found in Yogacara Buddhism. To achieve this vision of non-duality, it is necessary to recognise one's own mind. Writing on the Mahavairocana Sutra, Buddhist scholar and translator of that scripture, Stephen Hodge, comments:

The text also speaks of how all things can be accomplished once 'non-dual union with emptiness' is attained.

Yet ultimately even emptiness needs to be transcended, to the extent that it is not a vacuous emptiness, but the expanse of the mind of Buddha, Buddhic Awareness and Buddha-realms, all of which know of no beginning and no arising - as Stephen Hodge points out:

The sutra later reinforces the notion that Emptiness is not mere inert nothingness but is precisely the unlocalised locus where Vairocana resides. Vajrapani salutes the Buddha Vairocana with the following words:

Emptiness in Buddhist discourse usually means the flow of causation and result - the arising of causes and conditions - but in this scripture, Mahavairocana Buddha declares himself to be separate from all causes and conditions and without defect - truly mighty:

Popular culture 
The title of Chinese writer and film director Xu Haofeng's 徐浩峰 (b.1973) novel 《大日坛城》 Da ri tan cheng (published in 2010) refers to the Mahāvairocana Tantra.

Notes

Bibliography 
Abé, Ryuichi (1999). The Weaving of Mantra: Kukai and the Construction of Esoteric Buddhist Discourse. New York, NY: Columbia University Press, .
 Giebel, Rolf, transl. (2006), The Vairocanābhisaṃbodhi Sutra, Numata Center for Buddhist Translation and Research, Berkeley, .
Hodge, Stephen, transl. (2003). The : with Buddhaguhya’s commentary, London: RoutledgeCurzon, ISBN 978-1138980150.
 Hodge, Stephen (1994). "Considerations of the dating and geographical origins of the Mahavairocanabhisambodhi-sutra", The Buddhist forum, volume III; ed by T. Skorupski, pp. 57 – 83
Snellgrove, David (2002). Indo-Tibetan Buddhism : Indian Buddhists and their Tibetan Successors, Boston: Shambala. 
Tajima, R. (1936 ; reprint : 1992), Étude sur le Mahāvairocana-sūtra (Dainichikyō), Paris: Adrien-Maisonneuve.
Wayman, A and Tajima, R. (1998). The Enlightenment of Vairocana, Delhi: Motilal Banarsidass. 
Yamamoto, Chikyo. (1990).
Yamasaki, T. (1988). Shingon: Japanese Esoteric Buddhism, Fresno, CA: Shingon Buddhist International Institute.

External links 
The Vairocanābhisaṃbodhi Sutra. Taisho Tripitaka Vol. T18, No. 848 English language.
 Mahavairocana Sutra. CBETA. Taisho Tripitaka Vol. T18, No. 848 Chinese language.

Vajrayana
Vairocana Buddha
Kṣitigarbha